Neobyrnesia is a genus of flowering plants belonging to the family Rutaceae.

Its native range is Northern Australia.

Species
Species:
 Neobyrnesia suberosa J.A.Armstr.

References

Zanthoxyloideae
Zanthoxyloideae genera